There are five senior women's AFL leagues in Queensland governed by AFL Queensland.

The Queensland Australian Football League Women's (QAFLW) is the highest league in the State and provides elite women footballers the opportunity to play in a semi-professional environment. Many players from this league have represented their State, earned All-Australian honours, and participated in AFLW.

The second-tier of women's football in South-East Queensland is the Queensland Football Association Women's (QFAW), which was introduced in 2017. This competition is designed to allow women who are new to the game to develop their football understanding and skills, and also provide new clubs with an entry point into women's football.

Clubs

QAFLW Clubs

QFAW Division 1 Clubs

QFAW Division 2 Clubs

North

South

Premiers

QAFLW Grand Finals

Premierships by Club
Premiership tallies for the premier women's competition in Queensland (AFLQ Womens League 2001-2011, SEQAFL Womens League 2012-2013, QWAFL 2014-2018, QAFLW 2019-present)

QFAW Division 1 Grand Finals

QFAW Division 2 Grand Finals

QFAW Northern Rivers Grand Finals

QAFLW Awards

Emma Zielke Medal
The medal is awarded to the best and fairest player in the league, and was named after  player Emma Zielke in August 2021.

QAFLW Leading Goal Kicker

QAFLW Rising Star

See also

List of women's Australian rules football leagues

References

External links

Queens
Australian rules football competitions in Queensland
Sports leagues established in 2001
2001 establishments in Australia